Mario Bakary (born 21 July 1988) is a Malagasy footballer who plays as left back but also plays as a left midfielder on occasions. He plays for the national team and French club FC Fleury 91.

References

External links

1988 births
Living people
Malagasy footballers
Malagasy expatriate footballers
Madagascar international footballers
People from Antsiranana
Association football fullbacks
Association football midfielders
Fosa Juniors FC players
La Tamponnaise players
FC Fleury 91 players
Championnat National 2 players
Malagasy expatriate sportspeople in France
Expatriate footballers in France